BlackHatWorld (BHW) is an internet forum focused on black-hat search engine optimization (SEO) techniques and services, often known as spamdexing.

Site services are varied, including copywriting, graphic design, web design, SEO (including both on page and off page optimization), social media marketing, and app development. Other site services include bulk account registration, unconventional money making methods, social media botting, and developments in the SEO space. The services listed are provided by individual users via the use of marketplace threads after being reviewed by the administration.  Damien Trevatt, also known online as Diamond Damien, is known as the current owner of BlackHatWorld. 

Black Hat World has a community of users who express an interest in online marketing and digital business, and is a place where people are able to share ideas and seek advice from other members. The forum does not only focus on black-hat marketing practices, but also has sections dedicated to grey hat and white hat activities. There is also a dedicated "My Journey" section for the community to actively share their experiences and journey with internet marketing.

References

External links
 

Black hat search engine optimization
Internet forums
Digital marketing